ABC Radio Canberra (call sign: 2CN) is an ABC Local Radio station based in Canberra and broadcasting to the Australian Capital Territory as well as surrounding areas in New South Wales. This includes the cities and towns of Queanbeyan, Yass, and Bungendore.

The station began as 2CN in 1953 originally broadcasting on 1540 kHz and from 21 December 1974 at 1440 kHz. On 6 December 1983, it changed to its current AM frequency of 666 kHz. The station first broadcast from studios based at the transmitter site at Gungahlin. In 1957, the station was relocated to the centre of Canberra, before finally moving to purpose-built studios in Dickson in 1964.

ABC Radio announced digital radio services in Canberra, the simulcast of 666 ABC Canberra, ABC Radio National, ABC Classic FM, ABC News Radio and triple j launched in 2011.

When local programs are not being broadcast the station is a relay of ABC Radio Sydney.

Current presenters
Lish Fejer
Adam Shirley
Sabra Lane
Richard Fidler
Sarah Kanowski 
Sally Sara 
Georgia Stynes
Anna Vidot
Linda Mottram
Sarah Macdonald
Indira Naidoo
Philip Clark
Rod Quinn
Trevor Chappell
Scott Levi
Adrienne Francis
Mawunyo Gbogbo
Jonathon Gul
Ian McNamara
Kim Huynh
Christine Anu
Sirine Demachkie
Greg Bayliss
Craig Quartermaine

Ratings

References

External links
 

Canberra
Radio stations in Canberra
Radio stations established in 1953